Draba kluanei, also known as Kluane draba, is a species of plant in the Draba genus. It is endemic to the Kluane National Park in the Yukon, Canada. It is listed as possibly extinct by NatureServe.

References 

Endemic flora of Canada
kluanei